The Rhode Island State Airport Terminal is a historic airport terminal located on Airport Road in Warwick, Rhode Island, at what is now known as T. F. Green Airport. It was constructed in 1932, and added to the National Register of Historic Places on August 18, 1983.

History

The terminal building opened in January 1933. For many years, it was occupied by an office of the U.S. Weather Service.  It currently houses the offices of the Airport Operations Department.

See also
National Register of Historic Places listings in Kent County, Rhode Island

References

Transportation buildings and structures on the National Register of Historic Places in Rhode Island
Airports established in 1932
Airports in Rhode Island
Buildings and structures in Warwick, Rhode Island
National Register of Historic Places in Kent County, Rhode Island
Air transportation buildings and structures on the National Register of Historic Places
Transportation buildings and structures in Kent County, Rhode Island